Lithacodia phya is a species of moth in the family Noctuidae (the owlet moths). It is found in North America.

The MONA or Hodges number for Lithacodia phya is 9055.

References

Further reading

 
 
 

Eustrotiinae
Articles created by Qbugbot
Moths described in 1889